Robert Craggs-Nugent, 1st Earl Nugent PC (1709 – 13 October 1788) was an Irish politician and poet. He was tersely described by Richard Glover as a jovial and voluptuous Irishman who had left popery for the Protestant religion, money and widows.

Background
The son of Michael Nugent and Mary, daughter of Robert Barnewall, 9th Baron Trimlestown and Margaret Dongan, he was born at Carlanstown, County Westmeath, in 1709. He succeeded his father in the Carlanstown property on 13 May 1739.

Political career
His wife's property included the borough of St Mawes in Cornwall, and Nugent sat for that constituency from 1741 to 1754, after which date he represented Bristol until 1774, when he returned to St Mawes. By 1782, he had become the longest continually-serving member of the Commons, and so became the Father of the House.

In 1747 he succeeded Lord Doneraile as Comptroller of the Household to the Prince of Wales. Nugent lent the Prince large sums of money, which were never repaid; the appointments and peerages he received later in life have been attributed to the wish of the Prince of Wales's son, George III, to compensate Nugent.

Robert Craggs-Nugent, as he then was, served as a Lord of the Treasury from 1754 to 1759, and was made a Privy Counsellor on 15 December 1759. He was Vice-Treasurer of Ireland from 1759 to 1765, First Lord of Trade from 1766 to 1768, and Vice-Treasurer of Ireland again from 1768 to 1782. In 1768 he was made a member of the Irish Privy Council. His support of the ministry was so useful that he was created in 1767 Baron Nugent and Viscount Clare, and in 1776 Earl Nugent, all Irish peerages.

Apart from his political career, Lord Nugent was also the author of some poetical productions, several of which are preserved in the second volume of Dodsley's Collections (1748).

Family

Lord Nugent married firstly, on 14 July 1730, Emilia (died in childbirth 16 August 1731), daughter of Peter Plunkett, 4th Earl of Fingall. They had one son, Edmund, who became a Lieutenant-Colonel and the father of two illegitimate sons (later Field Marshal) Sir George Nugent, 1st Baronet, and Admiral of the Fleet Sir Charles Edmund Nugent) before dying in 1771.

Nugent married secondly, on 23 March 1736, Anna Knight (died 22 November 1756), widow of John Knight and daughter of James Craggs and sister of the Right Honourable James Craggs, the secretary of state. Nugent adopted the surname of Craggs-Nugent. She had already been widowed twice, but Robert, who was born a Roman Catholic, had abandoned his Church very early in life.

He married thirdly, on 2 January 1757, Elizabeth Drax (died 29 January 1792), the widow of the fourth Earl of Berkeley, who brought him a large fortune and with whom he had two daughters.

The earldom descended by special remainder to the earl's son-in-law, George Nugent-Temple-Grenville, 1st Marquess of Buckingham, and so to his successors, the dukes of Buckingham and Chandos.

References

Attribution

External links
 Robert Craggs Nugent at the Eighteenth-Century Poetry Archive (ECPA)

|-

|-

1709 births
1788 deaths
18th-century Irish poets
18th-century Irish male writers
Converts to Anglicanism from Roman Catholicism
Earls Nugent
Members of the Privy Council of Great Britain
Members of the Privy Council of Ireland
Politicians from County Westmeath
Members of the Parliament of Great Britain for Bristol
Members of the Parliament of Great Britain for St Mawes
British MPs 1741–1747
British MPs 1747–1754
British MPs 1754–1761
British MPs 1761–1768
British MPs 1768–1774
British MPs 1774–1780
British MPs 1780–1784
British MPs 1784–1790
Presidents of the Board of Trade
Robert
Peers of Ireland created by George III
Barons Nugent